The 2015 TCR International Series Red Bull Ring round was the eighth round of the 2015 TCR International Series season. It took place on 12 July at the Red Bull Ring. This round was to be held at Autódromo Juan y Oscar Gálvez on 26 July, but it was later moved due to organisational problems.

Stefano Comini won the first race, starting from fourth position, driving a SEAT León Cup Racer, and Pol Rosell gained the second one, driving a Volkswagen Golf TCR.

Success Ballast
Due to the results obtained in the previous round, Jordi Gené received +30 kg, Pepe Oriola +20 kg and Stefano Comini +10 kg.

Classification

Qualifying

Notes:
 — Dániel Nagy's best lap time in Q1 was deleted because it was obtained with yellow flags.
 — Diego Romanini was moved to the back of the grid for having not set a time within the 107% limit.

Race 1

Notes:
 — Gianni Morbidelli was given a 30-second penalty for unsportsmanlike drive.
 — Igor Skuz was given a five-place grid penalty for causing a collision with Bas Schouten in the Salzburgring round.

Race 2

Standings after the event

Drivers' Championship standings

Teams' Championship standings

 Note: Only the top five positions are included for both sets of drivers' standings.

References

External links
TCR International Series official website

Red Bull Ring
TCR International Series, Red Bull Ring